The triple contrabass viol is a modern variant of the French octobass, closely related to the double bass.

It was originally a three-stringed baroque instrument tuned C0–G0–C1 or C0–G0–D1 with the lower C coming in at 16.35 Hz. This is equivalent to the C two octaves below the cello's lowest C.

A four-string variant of the contrabass viol is played by bassist Brian Smith on Roscoe Mitchell's recording, Four Compositions (Lovely Music, 1988). It had two large circular holes in the body to facilitate recording.

References

Contrabass instruments
Viol family instruments